Roman Mykhailovych Zvarych (born 20 November 1953) is a Ukrainian politician. A former United States citizen, he was one of the first people to relinquish that citizenship in order to take up Ukrainian citizenship after the dissolution of the Soviet Union.

Early life
Zvarych was born in Yonkers, New York to Soviet émigré parents who came to the United States during World War II. In later interviews, he says that at age fifteen he swore an oath to "achieve Ukrainian statehood or ... die fighting for it". In 1976 he earned a B.A. with honors from Manhattan College in Bronx, New York.

Emigration to Ukraine and political career
Zvarych moved to Ukraine in 1991 with the intention of pursuing an academic career, but soon after became involved in politics. In 1992, he and Slava Stetsko founded the Congress of Ukrainian Nationalists, a right-wing party. He renounced his U.S. citizenship in 1995. Along with fellow politician Ivan Lozowy this made him one of the first former Americans to renounce U.S. citizenship in favour of Ukrainian citizenship. A notification confirming his loss of citizenship appeared in the Federal Register in June 1997 with his name listed as "Roman Mychajlo Zwarycz".

Zwarych ran for a seat in the 1994 election for a single-mandate seat representing a district of Kyiv in the Verkhovna Rada, and received 70% of the vote but was not elected due to his failure to meet the voter turnout threshold of 50% mandated by the electoral law at the time. He was eventually elected in the 1998 election from a party-list proportional district. Thereafter he sat in the Verkhovna Rada for six years, serving on various committees including the Committee on Legal Reform and the Committee on European Integration. Outside of the Verkhovna Rada he also moonlighted as a lawyer; Ukrainian courts had no requirement for practitioners of law to hold certifications or pass a bar examination. On one occasion Zvarych successfully defended a family against eviction. More importantly, during the Orange Revolution in the midst of the 2004 presidential election, he successfully argued a case on behalf of Viktor Yushchenko to prevent the creation of Ukrainian voting districts for Ukrainians in Russia.

In the spring of 2005, Ukrainian Pravda published an article alleging that the minister had 
not been a professor at Columbia University, had not authored scientific papers, and did not 
receive a diploma from the university as was stated in his official biographies. 

Then in an exclusive interview with The Ukrainian Weekly Roman Zvarych admitted that he 
had not received a masters or a doctoral degree from Columbia University, nor had he attained 
the rank of professor at New York University. And unfortunately he had no formal legal 
education, either. 

Columbia University confirmed that Roman Zvarych had not received a document of 
completion of higher education from them. Nor was the publication able to obtain confirmation 
from Manhattan College, where, according to Zvarych, he had received a bachelor’s degree. 
New York University spokesperson Josh Taylor told The Ukrainian Weekly that Zvarych had 
been "a part-time lecturer" in the School of Continuing and Professional Studies from 1989 to 
1991, i.e., not for eight years but for two. Teaching evening continuing education classes is a 
very common way in New York for businessmen and other non-academic people to acquire an 
academic gloss. 

As his basis for aspiring to the post of Justice Minister of country with 50 million people 
(certainly no banana republic), Zvarych said that he had served as a deputy in the country's 
legislative assembly for 6 years, and that gave him "considerable legal expertise." 
In the 2014 Ukrainian parliamentary election Zvarych was a candidate of Petro Poroshenko Bloc; placed 82nd on the electoral list. But the party only won 63 seats on the electoral list; hence he was not (re-)elected into parliament. But he returned to parliament nevertheless on 15 March 2018 to take the place of Valery Pakzkan who was just elected head of the Accounting Chamber of Ukraine.

References

1953 births
People from Yonkers, New York
American emigrants to Ukraine
People who renounced United States citizenship
Manhattan College alumni
Living people
Third convocation members of the Verkhovna Rada
Fourth convocation members of the Verkhovna Rada
Fifth convocation members of the Verkhovna Rada
Sixth convocation members of the Verkhovna Rada
Eighth convocation members of the Verkhovna Rada
Justice ministers of Ukraine
Petro Poroshenko Bloc politicians
Congress of Ukrainian Nationalists politicians
People's Movement of Ukraine politicians
Reforms and Order Party politicians
Our Ukraine (political party) politicians
Front for Change (Ukraine) politicians
21st-century Ukrainian politicians